Henry Barraud (sometimes Henri) (23 April 1900 – 28 December 1997) was a French composer.

He was born in Bordeaux. He was a student of Louis Aubert at the Conservatoire de Paris, but in 1927 failed to graduate, apparently because of his refusal to follow orthodox methods.  Along with Pierre-Octave Ferroud and Jean Rivier, he helped to form the society Triton for the wider distribution of contemporary music.

After the Liberation of Paris in 1944, he was named the Director of Paris Radio, and later, in 1948, of what later became ORTF, a position he held until his retirement in 1965.

Works
As a composer, Barraud wrote opera music, ballet music, orchestral music, chamber music, choral music and other vocal music. Paul Paray and the Detroit Symphony Orchestra recorded Barraud's orchestral work Offrande à une ombre in 1957 for Mercury Records.  This wartime memorial, commemorating the death during combat of Maurice Jaubert at the age of 40,  was initially released on LP in monophonic sound; the stereophonic version was issued on CD by Philips Records. A work listed as Symphony #1 for full orchestra (not just strings) was recorded on French Columbia FCX 597 (LP) performed by Georges Tzipine leading the ORTF. Its three movements are entitled Overture, Nocturne, and Interludes Dramatiques.

Opera
 Numance (Une Saison en Enfer) – tragédie lyrique in 1 act to a libretto by Salvador de Madariaga after Miguel de Cervantes. It premiered on 22 October 1980 at the Radio France Grand Auditorium in Paris conducted by Serge Baudo

Oratorio
Le Massacre des Saints Innocents – based on a text by the French poet Charles Guy

Instrumental works
Poème for orchestra (1932)
Wind trio (1935)
Piano Concerto (1939)
String Quartet (1939–40)
10 Impromptus (1941) for piano
Sonatine for violin and piano (1941)
Offrande à une ombre, for orchestra (1941–42) à la mémoire de Maurice Jaubert
Symphonie de Numance (Symphony n°1) (1950)
Concertino (1953) for piano, flute, clarinet, horn, bassoon and chamber orchestra
Symphony n°2 for string orchestra (1955–56)
Symphony n°3 (1956–57)
Divertimento for orchestra (1962)
Concerto for Flute and Strings (1963)
Symphonie concertante, for trumpet and orchestra (1965–66)
Trois Etudes, for orchestra (1967)
Variations à treize (1969) for a chamber orchestra of 13 instruments
Concert pour cordes (1971)
Quatuor de saxophones (1975)

Writings
Cinq grands opéras
Pour comprendre la musique d'aujourd'hui
La France et la musique occidentale
Berlioz

References

1900 births
1997 deaths
20th-century classical composers
French classical composers
French male classical composers
20th-century French composers
20th-century French male musicians